William Percival Richardson (25 February 1861 – 13 June 1933) was an English schoolmaster and a sportsman who played one game of first-class cricket for Cambridge University and also won a Blue for rugby. He was born at Great Barford, Bedfordshire and died at Littlestone-on-Sea, Kent.

Richardson was educated at Clifton College and Christ's College, Cambridge. He was in the cricket team at Clifton, but at Cambridge he was given only a single match: in the game against Lancashire in 1882 he scored 8 and 0 as a lower-order right-handed batsman and held one catch as a wicketkeeper. He was awarded a Blue for rugby football in 1883.

Richardson graduated from Cambridge University with a Bachelor of Arts degree in 1884. He became a schoolmaster, serving as assistant master at Blairlodge School at Polmont, Stirlingshire from 1884 to 1898 and at Warwick School from 1898 to 1905; he then became headmaster of St Chad's Preparatory School at Prestatyn in north Wales from 1905.

References

1861 births
1933 deaths
English cricketers
Cambridge University cricketers
Alumni of Christ's College, Cambridge
People educated at Clifton College
People from the Borough of Bedford